Ogy-Montoy-Flanville is a commune in the department of Moselle, northeastern France. The municipality was established on 1 January 2017 by merger of the former communes of Montoy-Flanville (the seat) and Ogy.

See also 
 Communes of the Moselle department

References

External links 
 

Communes of Moselle (department)
Populated places established in 2017
2017 establishments in France